Florida building collapse may refer to:

1974 Miami DEA building collapse
Harbor Cay Condominium collapse, a 1981 collapse of a condominium building under construction
Surfside condominium collapse, a 2021 collapse of an inhabited building

See also
List of structural failures and collapses